This is a list of notable systems engineers, people who were trained in or practice systems engineering, and made notable contributions to this field in theory or practice.



A 
 James S. Albus (1935–2011), American engineer, founder of NIST Intelligent Systems Division 
 Genrich Altshuller (1926–1998), Russian engineer; inventor of TRIZ, Theory of Inventive Problem Solving
 Arnaldo Maria Angelini (1909–1999), Italian engineer; Professor of Electrotechnics at the Sapienza University of Rome
 Fred Ascani (1917–2010), American Major General, "father of systems engineering at Wright Field"

B 
 Dave Bennett (born 1963)
 Benjamin Blanchard (1929–2019), Virginia Polytechnic Institute; SE educator; author of texts on systems engineering and related disciplines
 Wernher von Braun (1912–1977), chief architect of the Saturn V launch vehicle

C 
 Peter Checkland (born 1930), British management scientist and emeritus professor of Systems at Lancaster University; developer of soft systems methodology (SSM), a methodology based on a way of systems thinking
 Boris Chertok (1912–2011), Rocket Space Corporation "Energy", Moscow, Russia; 2004 Simon Ramo Medal winner for significant contributions to systems engineering and technical leadership of control systems design for the orbiting space station Mir
 Harold Chestnut (1918–2001), American electrical engineer and systems engineer; first president of the International Federation of Automatic Control (IFAC)
 John R. Clymer (born 1942), researcher, practitioner, and teacher in the field of systems engineering; INCOSE Fellow; expert in conceiving, engineering, and demonstrating computeraided design tools for context-sensitive, self-adaptive systems
 Mary (Missy) Cummings (born ca. 1966), Associate Professor of Aeronautics and Astronautics at the Massachusetts Institute of Technology; one of the first female fighter pilots in the U.S. Navy

E

F 
 Wolt Fabrycky (born 1932), Virginia Polytechnic Institute; SE educator; author of texts on systems engineering and related disciplines
 Irmgard Flügge-Lotz (1903–1974), Stanford University, developed discontinuous automatic control and laid the foundation for automatic on-off aircraft control in jets
 Kevin Forsberg (born 1934)
 Jacque Fresco (1916–2017), project director at The Venus Project

G 
 Tom Gilb (born 1940), American systems engineer; inventor of Planguage and Evolutionary Project Management
 Harry H. Goode (1909–1960), American computer engineer and systems engineer; professor at University of Michigan; until his death he was president of the National Joint Computer Committee (NJCC); with Robert Engel Machol, he wrote the famous System Engineering Handbook
 William Gosling (born ca. 1930), British electrical engineer, Emeritus Professor of Electrical Engineering at the University of Bath, and pioneer of system design in electrical engineering

H 
 Arthur David Hall III (1925–2006), American electrical engineer; worked at Bell Labs; one of the founders of the IEEE; was among the first general systems theorists; wrote A Methodology of Systems Engineering from 1962
 David Heebner, consultant; recipient of 2003 Simon Ramo Medal for leadership in introducing towed line array sonar systems for long range detection of submarines
 Derek Hitchins (born 1935), British systems engineer; professor in engineering management, in command & control and in systems science at the Cranfield University, Bedfordshire, England
Peggy Hodges OBE FRAeS FIMA (1921–2008), British engineer who worked on guided missile technology at GEC Marconi.

I 
 Junichi Iijima (born 1954), Japanese computer scientist; professor of the Department of Industrial Management and Engineering at the Tokyo Institute of Technology

J 

 Gwilym Jenkins (1933–1982), British statistician and systems engineer; professor of Systems Engineering at Lancaster University; best known for the Box–Jenkins methodology for fitting time series models
 Clarence "Kelly" Johnson (1910–1990), American aircraft engineer and aeronautical innovator; worked for Lockheed for more than four decades, playing a leading role in the design of over 40 aircraft, and acquiring a reputation as one of the most talented and prolific aircraft design engineers of the 20th century

K 
 Rudolf Emil Kálmán (1930–2016), American-Hungarian mathematical system theorist; an electrical engineer by training
 George Klir (1932–2016), Czech-American computer scientist and professor of systems sciences at the Center for Intelligent Systems at the  Binghamton University in New York; author of several texts on systems, including Architecture of Systems Problem Solving
 Sergei Pavlovich Korolev (1907–1966), Russian rocket and space systems designer beating the Americans during the Cold War times "space race" by Sputnik and putting the first man in space (Gagarin); his rocket and capsule designs are in principle still in use for supplying the International Space Station (Proton, Soyuz)
 Kurt Kosanke (born ca. 1945), German engineer, retired IBM manager, director of the AMICE Consortium and consultant; known for his work in the field of enterprise engineering, enterprise integration and CIMOSA
 Kitaw Ejigu (February 25, 1948 – January 13, 2006), Ethiopian American scientist who worked for NASA as Chief of Spacecraft and Satellite Systems; engineer known for his work on design of space shuttles and spacecraft and made a great influence in NASA

L 
 Robert J. Lano, systems engineer at TRW corporation; originator of the N2 chart
 Donald J. Leonard (born 1933), American engineer, AT&T executive, received the 1996 IEEE Simon Ramo Medal
 Donald H. Liles (born ca. 1948), American systems engineer; Emeritus Professor at the University of Texas at Arlington

M 
 Robert Engel Machol (1917–1998), early American systems engineer 
 Richard J. Mayer (born 1952), American engineer, developer of IDEF family of modeling languages
 John S. Mayo (born 1930), American engineer; seventh president of Bell Labs
 Harold Mooz (born ca. 1932), INCOSE systems engineering pioneer (2001); author of Visualizing Project Management (1996) and Communicating Project Management (2003); contributing author to The Wiley Guide to Managing Projects (2004); recipient of the CIA Seal Medallion
 Philip M'Pherson (1927–2016), British systems engineer; founder of the Department of Systems Science at City University
 George Mueller (1918–2015), American engineer; associate administrator of NASA during Apollo Program; pioneer of the "all-up" testing concept

N 
 James G. Nell (born 1938), American engineer; principal investigator of the Manufacturing Enterprise Integration Project at the National Institute of Standards and Technology (NIST); known for his work on enterprise integration

O 
 Hermann Oberth (1894–1989), Romanian/German space pioneer; derived basic rocket equations and described in principle all features of rockets and space stations still valid today; author of Die Rakete zu den Planetenraeumen (1923) and Wege zur Raumschiffahrt (1929); mentor of Wernher von Braun
 Tuncer Őren (born ca. 1935), Turkish/Canadian systems engineer; professor emeritus of Computer Science at the School of Information Technology and Engineering (SITE) of the University of Ottawa

P 
 Bradford Parkinson (born 1935), American professor of Aeronautics and Astronautics at the Stanford University; recipient of the Simon Ramo Medal for leading the concept development of GPS
 Samuel C. Phillips (1921–1990), USAF general; Director of NASA's Apollo Manned Lunar Landing Program

R 

 Simon Ramo (1913–2016), American physicist, engineer, and business leader; led development of microwave and missile technology; sometimes known as the "father of the ICBM"
 Eberhardt Rechtin (1926–2006), American systems engineer and respected authority in aerospace systems and systems architecture
 Allen B. Rosenstein (1920–2018), American systems engineer and Professor of Systems Engineering at the University of California at Los Angeles

S 
 Andrew P. Sage (1933–2014), School of Information Technology and Engineering, George Mason University; recipient of the 2000 Simon Ramo Medal for outstanding contributions to the field of systems engineering; series editor of a textbook series on systems engineering and management for John Wiley & Son
 Robert Seamans (1918–2008), NASA Deputy Administrator and MIT professor
 Joseph Francis Shea (1925–1999), systems engineer on the Titan I ballistic missile; head of the Apollo Spacecraft Program Office
 Nikolai Sheremetevsky, Advisor to Director, All Russia Institute for Electromechanics; recipient of the 2004 Simon Ramo Medal for significant contributions to systems engineering and technical leadership of control systems design for the orbiting space station Mir
 Neil Siegel (born 1954), Vice-President and Chief Engineer of the Northrop Grumman Corporation; lead systems engineer for many US Army systems; member of the US National Academy of Engineering; Fellow of the IEEE; recipient of the Simon Ramo Medal in 2011 for his work on the US Army's digital battlefield system
 William W. Simmons (born 1932), American physicist and development of electro-optical devices
 Edward Sussengeth (1932–2015), American engineer, developer of APL programming language and multiple IBM computer systems
 Alistair Sutcliffe (born 1951), British engineer; professor at University of Manchester

T 
 Arnold Tustin (1899–1994), British engineer; Professor of Engineering at the University of Birmingham and at Imperial College London; made important contributions to the development of control engineering and its application to electrical machines

W 
 John N. Warfield (1925–2009), American electrical engineering and systems scientist; member of the Academic Committee of the International Encyclopedia of Systems and Cybernetics
 Kevin Warwick (born 1954), Deputy Vice-Chancellor (Research) at Coventry University; previously Professor of Cybernetics at the University of Reading; best known for his implant research linking humans and technology as a system
 Brian Wilson (born 1933), British systems scientist and honorary professor at Cardiff University; known for his development of soft systems methodology (SSM) and enterprise modelling
 A. Wayne Wymore (1927–2011), American mathematician and systems engineer; founder and first Chairman of Systems and Industrial Engineering (SIE) Department at the University of Arizona;  one of the first Fellows of International Council on Systems Engineering (INCOSE)

See also 
 Lists of engineers – for lists of engineers from other disciplines
 List of systems scientists
 People in systems and control
 List of systems engineering at universities
 INCOSE Pioneer Award

References 

Systems engineers
 
Systems engineering